Keyrouz or the variant Kayrouz is an Arabic surname. It may refer to:

Elie Keyrouz, Lebanese politician, Member of Parliament, a member of the Lebanese Forces party
Ghassan Keyrouz (born 1951), Lebanese alpine skier
Jean Keyrouz (born 1931), Lebanese alpine skier
Marie Keyrouz (born 1963), a Lebanese nun and a chanter of Oriental Church music
Rabih Kayrouz (born 1973), Lebanese fashion designer, creator and founder of the fashion house Maison Rabih Kayrouz, established in Paris
Raymond Kayrouz (born 1970), Lebanese alpine skier
Naji Keyrouz (1960–2019), Lebanese judoka

See also
Danny Thomas (born Amos Muzyad Yakhoob Kairouz; 1912–1991), American comedian, singer, actor, and producer of Lebanese origin whose career spanned five decades